Jessica Fanzo is an American scientist.  She is the Bloomberg Distinguished Professor of Global Food and Agriculture Policy and Ethics at the Johns Hopkins Berman Institute of Bioethics, the Bloomberg School of Public Health, and the Paul H. Nitze School of Advanced International Studies. Prior to coming to Johns Hopkins, Fanzo was an assistant professor of Nutrition in the Institute of Human Nutrition and Department of Pediatrics at Columbia University.

Early life and education
Fanzo was born into an Italian-American working-class family. She earned her Bachelor of Science degree, Master's degree, and PhD from the University of Arizona and completed a Stephen I. Morse postdoctoral fellowship in Immunology at Columbia University.

Career
Upon completing her postdoctoral research, Fanzo chose to focus on the field of global health and went to rural sub-Saharan Africa to assist with international work on HIV/AIDS. In 2007, Fanzo was appointed the nutrition director of Columbia University's Earth Institute and provided technical and policy counsel on international development projects and programs as the senior adviser for nutrition policy at Columbia's Center on Globalization and Sustainable Development, and at the United Nations World Food Programme, World Health Organization, UNICEF, and World Bank. Fanzo left Columbia in 2015 to become the Bloomberg Distinguished Professor of Global Food and Agriculture Policy and Ethics at the Johns Hopkins Berman Institute of Bioethics, the Bloomberg School of Public Health, and the Paul H. Nitze School of Advanced International Studies. While serving in this role, she was the co-recipient of a 2017 Johns Hopkins University Berman Institute for Bioethics Exploration of Practical Ethics Research Grant and JHU Berman Institute for Bioethics Exploration of Practical Ethics Research grant.

Fanzo then took a year's sabbatical from Johns Hopkins University to serve as the Senior Programme Officer for Nutrition and Food Systems at the Food and Agriculture Organization.  She was later named Team Lead on Food Security and Nutrition. During the COVID-19 pandemic, Fanzo was the recipient of a COVID-19 Launchpad Grant created by The Alliance for a Healthier World for her proposal "Assessing Food Security Status Among Urban and Rural Vulnerable Groups in Sri Lanka During COVID-19." As a result of her experience, Fanzo is an Associate Editor on The American Journal of Clinical Nutrition and Editor-in-Chief of Global Food Security.

Personal life
Fanzo and her husband write a blog titled Goat Rodeo.

Selected publications
Can Fixing Dinner Fix the Planet? (2021)

References

External links

Living people
Year of birth missing (living people)
Place of birth missing (living people)
Johns Hopkins University faculty
Columbia University faculty
University of Arizona alumni
American people of Italian descent
Academic journal editors